Jack-Knife Gypsy is the second album from folk rock/country rock musician Paul Siebel.

Reception

Music critic Jim Worbois wrote in his Allmusic  "The first record may have drawn listeners for the opportunity to hear Siebel originals of songs they knew from elsewhere. This record does not have that same kind of pull but is every bit as good."

Reissues
Jack-Knife Gypsy was reissued on CD by Line in 1994.
Jack-Knife Gypsy was reissued on CD with Woodsmoke and Oranges by WEA International in 2004.
Jack-Knife Gypsy was reissued on CD with Woodsmoke and Oranges and two bonus cuts by Beat Goes On in 2020.

Track listing
All songs by Paul Siebel.

"Jasper and the Miners"  – 2:37
"If I Could Stay"  – 3:41
"Jack-Knife Gypsy" – 3:25
"Prayer Song"  – 4:47
"Legend of the Captain's Daughter" – 3:51
"Chips Are Down" – 4:29
"Pinto Pony" – 2:22
"Hillbilly Child" – 2:58
"Uncle Dudley" – 3:09
"Miss Jones" – 4:24
"Jeremiah's Song" – 2:01

Personnel
Paul Siebel - rhythm guitar, vocals
Clarence White - lead guitar
Robert Warford - lead guitar
Buddy Emmons - steel guitar
David Grisman - mandolin; string arrangement on "Prayer Song"
Jim Buchanan - violin, viola
Doug Kershaw - fiddle
Bill Wolf - bass
Bernie Leadon - guitar
Gary White - bass
Ralph Schuckett - organ, piano
Russ Kunkel - drums
Paul Dillon, Peter Ecklund, Peter Kubaska, Ralph Lee Smith - other sidemen
Richard Greene - string on "Prayer Song"

Production
Producer: Robert W. Zachary
Recording Engineer: Bill Lazerus at Sunset Sound, LA / Fritz Richmond at Elektra Sound Recorders, LA
Overdub Engineer: Greg Fulginiti at Elektra Sound Recorders, NYC
Mixing: Bruce Morgan at Elektra Sound Recorders, LA
Art Direction: Robert L. Heimall
Photography: Frank Bez
Mastering: Bob Ludwig

References

Paul Siebel albums
1971 albums
Elektra Records albums
Warner Music Group albums